Artemiy Vladimirovich Artsikhovsky (December 26 (December 13, O.S.), 1902 — February 17, 1978) was a Russian Soviet archaeologist and historian, professor (since 1937), head of the department of archaeology (since 1939) of the Moscow State University, the discoverer of birch bark manuscripts in Novgorod. Corresponding member of the USSR Academy of Sciences, recipient of the USSR State Prize (1970, 1982 (posthumously)).

Books
Курганы вятичей, М., 1930; 
Древнерусские миниатюры как исторический источник, [М.], 1944
Введение в археологию, 3 изд., М., 1947
Основы археологии, 2 изд., М., 1955
Новые открытия в Новгороде, М., 1955 (in Russian and French)
Новгородские грамоты на бересте, т. 1—6, М., 1953—63.

References

Archaeologists from Moscow
1902 births
1978 deaths
20th-century archaeologists
Academic staff of Moscow State University
Rossiyskaya arkheologiya editors